New Sounds was originally a 10" LP compiling previously released 78 rpm records on the Blue Note label. A CD reissue with the same name and cover appeared in 1991, but while using many of the same personnel, had only two tracks in common with the original LP. It instead compiled a distinct James Moody 10" LP (James Moody and his Modernists, BLP 5006) with the Art Blakey tracks and included several tracks previously unreleased on LP or any format. Conversely, the tracks omitted from the CD, which were on the Moody LP, have not been reissued on CD.

Background
In December 1947, Art Blakey formed a group for his first sessions as a leader. Dubbed Art Blakey's Messengers, this group was a precursor to The Jazz Messengers groups of the next decade and beyond. Blakey had recently gone on a pilgrimage to Africa and adopted Islam. Many of his fellow musicians had adopted the religion as well, and the "Messengers" name was a nod to the message of the religion. Five tracks were recorded during this session, four of which came out on 78s. Two of the tracks were on the original 10" LP, all five are on the CD.

Three of the other four tracks on the original 10" LP were recorded by a group billed as the Max Roach Quintet, recorded in Paris in May 1949. This group included James Moody and Kenny Dorham (who was also in Blakey's Messengers). The final track was recorded by a Moody-led group in Switzerland, in April 1949. These four tracks were originally released on three 78s.

As noted above the previous four tracks were omitted from the CD and replaced by two different James Moody sessions which were previously released on the 10" LP James Moody and His Modernists (BLP 5006). This LP, too, was a compilation of records originally released as 78s. The New Sounds CD includes the entirety of these two sessions—recorded October 19 and 25, 1948—including a previously unreleased alternate take of "The Fuller Bop Man."

Reception
In his review of the CD version of New Sounds, Scott Yanow of AllMusic described the recordings as "historically significant. Classic and formerly rare music."

Track listing

Original LP

Compact disc

Personnel

Art Blakey's Messengers
LP Tracks A3 and B3, CD tracks 10–14
 Kenny Dorham – trumpet
 Haleen Rashid – trombone
 Sahib Shihab – alto saxophone
 Musa Kaleem – tenor saxophone
 Ernest Thompson – baritone saxophone
 Walter Bishop, Jr. – piano
 Laverne Barker – double bass
 Art Blakey – drums

Max Roach Quintet
LP tracks A1, A2, B1
 Kenny Dorham – trumpet
 James Moody – tenor saxophone
 Al Haig – piano
 Tommy Potter – double bass
 Max Roach – drums

James Moody Quartet
LP track B2
 James Moody – tenor saxophone
 Art Simmons – piano
 Alvin "Buddy" Banks – double bass
 Clarence Terry – drums

James Moody's Modernists
CD tracks 1–9
 Dave Burns, Elmon Wright – trumpet
 Ernie Henry – alto saxophone
 James Moody – tenor saxophone
 Cecil Payne – baritone saxophone
 James "Hen Gates" Forman – piano
 Nelson Boyd – double bass
 Teddy Stewart – drums (tracks 1–5)
 Art Blakey – drums (tracks 6–9)
 Chano Pozo – conga, vocals (tracks 6–9)
 Gil Fuller – arranger

Notes

References

Art Blakey albums
Max Roach albums
1952 albums
Albums produced by Alfred Lion
Albums produced by Michael Cuscuna
Blue Note Records albums